Dichomeris macroxyla is a moth in the family Gelechiidae. It was described by Edward Meyrick in 1913. It is found in Assam, India.

The forewings are whitish ochreous, the posterior two-thirds of the costa, and dorsum and termen throughout rather broadly suffused with brown, darkest on the margin of the wing, cut at the apex by a fine streak of ground colour. The stigmata is minute, blackish, the plical slightly before the first discal. A black line runs around the apex and termen. The hindwings are grey.

References

Moths described in 1913
macroxyla